Jacques Lenot (born 29 August 1945) is a French composer. His compositional techniques are derived from serialism.

References
Corraziari, Andréa. 2007. "Les études pour piano du premier livre de György Ligeti: un laboratoire pédagogique", mémoire en pédagogie, CNSMDP.
 Gueit, Philippe. 1989. "Un compositeur français d'aujourd'hui". Revue internationale de musique française, no. 30:
 Langlois, Franck (ed.). 2007. Jacques Lenot, utopies & allégories (conversations). Collection Paroles. [N.p.]: Éditions MF.
 Mallet, Franck'. 1986. "Entretien avec Jacques Lenot". Le Monde de la musique (December):.
 Michel, Pierre. 2001. "Lenot, Jacques". The New Grove Dictionary of Music and Musicians, second edition, edited by Stanley Sadie and John Tyrrell. London: Macmillan Publishers.

External links
 Jacques Lenot's personal site
 Jacques Lenot at Intrada
 
 Entretien avec Bertrand Bolognesi (16 November 2005)

20th-century classical composers
21st-century classical composers
French male classical composers
French opera composers
Male opera composers
1945 births
Living people
20th-century French composers
21st-century French composers
20th-century French male musicians
21st-century French male musicians